Fossoli is an Italian village and hamlet (frazione) of Carpi, a city and municipality of the province of Modena, Emilia-Romagna. It is infamous for the homonym concentration camp and has a population of about 4400.

History
Born as a rural village, Fossoli became sadly famous during World War II, for the concentration camp located near the settlement. Created in 1942 as a Prisoner of War (PoW) camp, in 1943 it became a concentration camp for Jews, during the Italian Social Republic.

Geography
Fossoli lies on a plain, next to the Province of Reggio Emilia, between Carpi (5 km south) and Novi di Modena (8 km north). It is crossed by the provincial highway SP413 and, in the west, by the Verona–Mantua–Modena railway, on which stood a station, now closed. The village is 27 km from Modena, 32 from Reggio Emilia, 51 from Mantua, and 68 from Bologna.

Next to Fossoli is located the WWF nature reserve "Oasi La Francesca", a marsh that extends for 23 hectares.

Personalities
Amleto Frignani (1932-1997), footballer

Gallery

References

External links

Frazioni of the Province of Modena
Carpi, Emilia-Romagna